TheaterClub/Kyiv was one of the first independent experimental theatre groups in post-Soviet Ukraine. It was established by Oleg Liptsin in Kyiv in 1989 and was active until 1998.  During this time TheaterClub/Kyiv produced a number of avant-garde style award-winning productions and international theatre projects performed in different parts of the world.

Theatre in Ukraine
Theatre companies in Ukraine
Theatres in Kyiv